= CYP154C3 =

Cytochrome P450 family 154 subfamily C member 3 (abbreviated CYP154C3) is an actinobacterial Cytochrome P450 enzyme originally from Streptomyces, which catalyzes the 16α-hydroxylation of various steroids.
